Lilou Graciet (born 26 February 2004) is a French rugby sevens player. She plays for Lyon OU Rugby. She won a bronze medal at the 2022 Rugby World Cup Sevens.

Refernences 

Living people
2004 births
French rugby sevens players
France international women's rugby sevens players